Virginia Randolph Cary (January 30, 1786 – May 2, 1852) was an American writer. She was the author of Letters on Female Character, Addressed to a Young Lady, on the Death of Her Mother (1828), an influential advice book.

Early life and family

Virginia Randolph Cary was born on January 30, 1786, most likely in Goochland County, Virginia, at Tuckahoe, the plantation owned by her parents. Her twelve sisters and brothers included Mary Randolph (1762–1828), author of the influential cookbook The Virginia House-Wife (1824), and Thomas Mann Randolph, Jr. (1768–1828), who served in the United States House of Representatives from 1803 to 1807 and as Governor of Virginia from 1819 to 1822.

After her mother died in 1789, the three-year-old Cary lived at Monticello in Albemarle County, Virginia with her brother and sister-in-law, Thomas Mann Randolph Jr. and Martha Jefferson (1772–1836), the daughter of Thomas Jefferson. Her sister Judith married William Randolph's great-grandson, Richard Randolph of Bizarre. His paternal ancestors included Pocahontas, the youngest daughter of Chief Powhatan and her English-born husband John Rolfe. Her older sister, Ann Cary "Nancy" Randolph, was the wife of Gouverneur Morris and mother of Gouverneur Morris Jr. Ann figured in a scandal involving her brother-in-law and distant cousin, Richard Randolph of Bizarre, in which he was responsible for "feloniously murdering a child said to be borne of Nancy [Ann] Randolph."

Works
After the death of her husband in 1823, as a widow, she published four major works:
   (an advice book)
 Mutius: An Historical Sketch of the Fourth Century, American Sunday-School Union, (1828)
 
 Ruth Churchill; or, The True Protestant: A Tale for the Times (1851), C. Shepard & Co., a novel

Personal life
On August 28, 1805 she married her cousin Wilson Jefferson Cary (1783-1823), of Fluvanna County, Virginia. They had six children:
Col. Wilson Miles Cary (1806–1877), who married Jane Margaret Carr (1809–1903)
Archibald Cary (1815-1854), who married Monimia Fairfax (1820–1875), the daughter of Thomas Fairfax, 9th Lord Fairfax of Cameron (1762–1846).
Jane Blair Cary
Elizabeth Randolph Cary
Mary Randolph Cary (1811–1887), who married Orlando Fairfax, son of Thomas Fairfax, 9th Lord Fairfax of Cameron
Martha Jefferson Cary (1820-1873), who married Gouverneur Morris Jr. (1813–1888)
Cary died in Alexandria, Virginia, and is buried in Saint Paul's Episcopal Church Cemetery.

Descendants
Her granddaughter was the writer Constance Cary (1843–1920), who was one of three women to sew the first examples of the Confederate Battle Flag. She was married to Burton Harrison (1838–1904). Another granddaughter was Hetty Cary (1836–1892), who married John Pegram (1832–1865) and later Henry Newell Martin (1848–1896).

See also
Randolph family of Virginia

References

Sources
 Cynthia A. Kierner, "'The dark and dense cloud perpetually lowering over us': Gender and the Decline of the Gentry in Postrevolutionary Virginia," Journal of the Early Republic 20 (2000): 185–217.
 Patrick H. Breen, ed., "The Female Antislavery Petition Campaign of 1831–32," Virginia Magazine of History and Biography 110 (2002): 377–398.

External links

1786 births
1852 deaths
American religious writers
Women religious writers
Virginia Randolph
People from Albemarle County, Virginia
People from Goochland County, Virginia
Randolph family of Virginia
Writers from Virginia
19th-century American writers
19th-century American women writers
American women non-fiction writers
American people of Powhatan descent